The men's long jump event at the 2006 World Junior Championships in Athletics was held in Beijing, China, at Chaoyang Sports Centre on 15 and 16 August.

Medalists

Results

Final
16 August

Qualifications
15 August

Group A

Group B

Participation
According to an unofficial count, 24 athletes from 20 countries participated in the event.

References

Long jump
Long jump at the World Athletics U20 Championships